The Chicago Avenue Pumping Station is a historic district contributing property in the Old Chicago Water Tower District landmark district.  It is located on Michigan Avenue along the Magnificent Mile shopping district in the Near North Side community area of Chicago, Illinois.  It is on the east side of Michigan Avenue opposite the Chicago Water Tower.

The pumping station was built in 1869 by architect William W. Boyington. In 1918, when Pine Street was widened, the plans were altered in order to give the Chicago Water Tower and Pumping Station a featured location.

Renovation

In 2003 and 2004 the building underwent an award-winning adaptive reuse project, in which much of its interior was converted to a theater space which now houses the Lookingglass Theatre Company.  The redevelopment projects carried out at this time include roof deck replacement, façade restoration, exterior architectural lighting improvements, landscaping improvements, and lead paint abatement.  The remainder of the building still serves as an active pumping station, as of 2018.

Awards
The following awards were won for redevelopment and renovation:

Consulting Engineers Council of Illinois, ACEC Engineering Excellence-State Level: Honor Award-Illinois, Structural Systems category, 2004
City of Chicago Landmarks Preservation, Chicago Landmark Award for Preservation Excellence, 2003
Consulting Engineers Council of Illinois, ACEC Engineering Excellence-State Level: Honor Award-Illinois, 2003
National Council of Structural Engineers Association, NCSEA Excellence in Structural Engineering Award - Merit Award, Building project under $5 million, 2003
Richard H. Driehaus Foundation - DePaul University, Richard H. Driehaus Foundation Public Innovator Award, Honorable Mention, Local, This award was for a combination of the Roof Deck Replacement and other Facility & Site Enhancements, including Exterior Architectural Lighting & Landscaping Improvements and Facade Restoration in which HDR was vitally involved, 2003
Structural Engineers Association (SEA), SEA Excellence in Structural Engineering Award: Overall Excellence, Best Small Structure Category, Local, Projects under $5 Million, 2003

Notes

See also
 Chicago architecture
 Water tower
 Water Tower Place

Towers in Illinois
Water supply pumping stations on the National Register of Historic Places
Buildings and structures on the National Register of Historic Places in Chicago
Historic district contributing properties in Illinois
Infrastructure completed in 1869
1869 establishments in Illinois
Water supply infrastructure in Illinois